The 2002 Züri-Metzgete was the 87th edition of the Züri-Metzgete road cycling one day race. It was held on 18 August 2002 as part of the 2002 UCI Road World Cup. The race was won by Dario Frigo of Italy.

Result

References 

Züri-Metzgete
Züri-Metzgete
Züri-Metzgete